Giitu is an album by the Finnish folk music group Angelin tytöt, released in 1993 in Finland. The musical tracks consist mainly of traditional Sámi yoiking accompanied by a guitar. The album was recorded at Finnvox Studios in Helsinki and mixed by Risto Hemmi.

Track listing
 "Meahci jienat"  – 3:02
 "Golbma irkki"  – 2:38
 "Dápmun didjiite"  – 5:42
 "Básejavr Ovllá Hánsa"  – 1:51
 "Don leat"  – 2:08
 "Skealbma nieida"  – 3:07
 "Oađe oabbažán"  – 3:48
 "Muittut"  – 5:11
 "Anná Màhte"  – 1:16
 "Ustitvuohta"  – 3:20

1993 albums
Angelit albums